Aglaia bullata is a tree in the family Meliaceae. The bark is greyish brown. The specific epithet  is from the Latin meaning "puckered", referring to the leaflets. Habitat is mixed dipterocarp forests from sea-level to  altitude. A. bullata is endemic to Borneo and confined to Malaysia's Sarawak state.

References

bullata
Plants described in 2004
Endemic flora of Borneo
Trees of Borneo
Flora of Sarawak
Flora of the Madagascar lowland forests